LeMessurier Consultants is a Boston, Massachusetts firm, founded by William LeMessurier in 1961. It provides engineering support services to architects and construction firms. They focus on advanced structural techniques and impacts to construction materials. They are known for their modular construction techniques including the Mah-LeMessurier System for precast concrete in high-rise housing, the Staggered Truss System for high-rise steel structures, and the tuned mass damper used to reduce tall building motion. One of the best known uses of the damper is the John Hancock Tower in Boston.  In addition to new construction, they also work with retrofitting buildings and  historic preservation.

Projects

W Hotel & Residences, Boston, MA
Emmanuel College Academic Building, Boston, MA
AXA Tower, Singapore
Beijing Yintai Centre, Beijing, China
Landmark Tower, Yokohama, Japan
Westendstrasse 1, Frankfurt, Germany
1250 René-Lévesque, Montreal, Canada
World Trade Centre Residence, Dubai, United Arab Emirates
Jumeirah Lake Towers, Dubai, United Arab Emirates
King Khalid Military City, Saudi Arabia
Boston City Hall, Boston, MA
Boston Public Library Johnson Building, Boston, MA
Citigroup Center, New York, NY
IBM Building, New York, NY
State Street Bank Building, Boston, MA
Columbus Center, New York, NY
500 Boylston Street, Boston, MA
Lurie Children's Hospital, Chicago, IL
125 High Street, Boston, MA
MBTA Alewife Garage, Cambridge, MA
Children's Hospital of Philadelphia, Philadelphia, PA
University Park Garage, Cambridge, MA
Ordway Center for the Performing Arts, St. Paul, MN
Faneuil Hall Restoration, Boston, MA
Trinity Church Restoration and Expansion, Boston, MA
Post Office Square Garage, Boston, MA
Boston Common Garage rehabilitation work, Boston, MA
National Aquarium, Baltimore, MD
Boston Convention and Exhibition Center, Boston, MA
Bank of America Plaza, Dallas, TX
Dallas/Fort Worth International Airport, Dallas, TX
Blueprints at Addison Circle, Addison, TX
Stephen P. Clark Government Center, Miami, FL
Chase Tower, Indianapolis, IN
New England Aquarium, Boston, MA
Trinity College, Library Addition, Hartford, CT
National Air and Space Museum, Washington, D.C.
John Joseph Moakley United States Courthouse, Boston MA
PacWest Center, Portland, OR
Federal Reserve Bank Building (Boston), Boston, MA
Olin College of Engineering's  Olin Center, Needham, MA
Olin College of Engineering's  Academic Center, Needham, MA
Olin College of Engineering's  Campus Center, Needham, MA
Olin College of Engineering's  East and West Hall, Needham, MA
Amherst College, Science Center, Amherst, MA
Cornell University, Duffield Center, Ithaca, NY
Dartmouth College, Black Family Visual Arts Center, Hanover, NH
Dartmouth College, Nathaniel Leverone Field House, Hanover, NH
Duke University, French Family Science Center, Durham, NC
Harvard University, Carpenter Center for the Visual Arts Restoration, Cambridge, MA
Harvard University, Gund Hall, Cambridge, MA
Harvard University, Harvard Art Museums Restoration, Cambridge, MA
Harvard University, Littauer Building, Cambridge, MA
Harvard University, Life Sciences Building, Cambridge, MA
Harvard University, Memorial Hall Restoration, Cambridge, MA
Harvard University, Harvard Medical School New Research Building, Boston, MA
Harvard University, Tata Hall, Boston, MA
Harvard University, Tozzer Library, Cambridge, MA
Massachusetts Institute of Technology, MIT.nano, Cambridge, MA
Massachusetts Institute of Technology, Brain and Cognitive Science Complex, Cambridge, MA
Massachusetts Institute of Technology, Gordon Center for Integrative Science, Cambridge, MA
Massachusetts Institute of Technology, Koch Institute for Integrative Cancer Research, Cambridge, MA 
Massachusetts Institute of Technology, Sloan School of Management, Cambridge, MA
Tufts University, School of Dental Medicine, Cambridge, MA
University of Chicago, South Residence Halls and Dining, Chicago, IL
University of Pennsylvania, Life Sciences Building,  Philadelphia PA
Wellesley College, Pendleton Hall Addition and Renovation, Wellesley, MA
Yale University, Adams Center for Musical Arts, New Haven, CT
Yale University, Kline Biology Tower, New Haven, CT
Loyola University Chicago, Neiswanger Institute for Bioethics & Health Policy, Maywood, IL

See also
Simpson Gumpertz & Heger Inc.
Thornton Tomasetti
Arup Group
Skidmore, Owings, and Merrill

References

External links
Audio Slide Show of the John Hancock Damper

Construction and civil engineering companies of the United States
Companies based in Boston
Engineering consulting firms of the United States
Privately held companies based in Massachusetts